Dragutin Gavrilović (25 May 1882 – 19 July 1945) was a Serbian and Yugoslav military officer, best known for his heroic defense of Belgrade during the First World War.

Biography
Dragutin Gavrilović was born in Čačak, Serbia, in 1882. After his graduation from the Military Academy of Serbia in 1901, he took part in every war the Serbian army fought until World War II.

He is best remembered in Serbian history books for his dramatic order to his troops issued on October 7, 1915, the first day of the defense of Belgrade against the Austro-Hungarian and German attack during the First World War. Holding the rank of major, Gavrilović at the time commanded the 2nd battalion of the 10th Infantry Regiment, which, along with a detachment of Belgrade gendarmerie and a group of about 340 volunteers from Syrmia, was defending positions at the very confluence of Sava and Danube, beneath the Kalemegdan Fortress. In the early morning, Austro-Hungarian troops attacked across the rivers after a heavy two-day artillery barrage; the Serbians in a series of counterattacks trapped the invaders against the Danube with heavy casualties on both sides. The Serbian position grew worse every minute because of an incessant flow of Austro-Hungarian reinforcements and a vast superiority in artillery, which the Serbs countered by employing close-quarter tactics.

The Serbs had their last stand in front of the "Jasenica" kafana, there the soldiers took flowers from a small flower shop and put them on their coats and on their guns as they prepared for one last charge into certain death. Before throwing them into a counterattack, Major Gavrilović rallied them with a call to arms:

The desperate charge that followed, in which Gavrilović was badly wounded, failed to destroy the Austro-Hungarian bridgehead. The timely intervention of Austro-Hungarian river monitors which approached the shore to deliver point-blank artillery fire with much-reduced fear of hitting their own troops, and to which the engaged Serbian units had no effective counter, played a major role in defeating the attack. But the charge and similar acts of bravery and self-sacrifice by Serbian troops and by the inhabitants of Belgrade during the battle earned deep respect from the invaders, who suffered around 10,000 casualties in the course of capturing the city. The German commander August von Mackensen himself erected a monument on the battleground commemorating the city's zealous defenders; it still stands to this day and is inscribed with the words "Here Rest Serbian Heroes" in German and Serbian, a rare example in military history, of one army building a monument to their enemies.

Gavrilović was carried back by the survivors of his regiment, he was awarded the Serbian war medal, Karadjordje's star, the French Croix de Guerre, among others.

After surviving the defense of Belgrade, he withdrew with the Serbian army to Corfu, and after the breakthrough of the Thessaloniki front, Vojvoda Petar Bojović proposed him for a higher rank, but Vojvoda Stepa Stepanović did not accept that, explaining that he was too young.

He was not favored among the officers, because he did not belong to any secret organization, such as Black Hand or White Hand. After the war, he took the general exam in Štip in 1930, but failed. Gavrilović was offended and did not want to take it again.

After the Great War, he lectured military administration at the Military Academy in Belgrade. On 27 March 1941, General Dušan Simović offered him the rank of general and the position of Minister of the Army and Navy, but he refused, explaining that he was not interested in the proposal and that he was a soldier.

After Yugoslav capitulation in the April War, Colonel Gavrilović was captured in Sarajevo and taken to a concentration camp near Nuremberg. He returned from captivity only in 1945, seriously ill. He was in the collection center in Banjica for seven days, where he recovered a little. Then he came home, to his apartment on Slavija, where he died ten days later. Malnourishment during the captivity was one of the main factors contributing to Gavrilović's death. Gavrilović was buried wearing a colonel's uniform of the Royal Yugoslavian Army at the New Cemetery in Belgrade. His family was considered part of the old regime and was discriminated against by the communist authorities. His daughters had difficulty finding a job in post-war Belgrade and the family was being denied his military pension for over a decade after the war has ended.  However, rumors about Gavrilović's imprisonment, rape of both of his daughters, and his eventual murder at the hands of the new communist regime were dismissed by his own family members as recently as 2011.

Legacy and honors
A street stretching along the Danube riverbank in the Dorćol area of Belgrade (where Gavrilović and his men fought) bears the name Major Gavrilović's riverbank in his memory. There are also streets bearing his name in the cities of Kragujevac Niš, Čačak, Valjevo, Zrenjanin, Užice and Bijeljina.

Swedish heavy metal band Sabaton wrote the song "Last Dying Breath" from their album The Last Stand in his honor, referencing quotes by him in the lyrics.

References

Citations

Books 

 Dr. Savo Skoko: Vojvoda Radomir Putnik (2), Beogradski izdavačko-grafički zavod, Belgrade 1985. (pages 238-240)

1882 births
1945 deaths
Military personnel from Čačak
Serbian soldiers
Serbian people of World War I
Serbian people of World War II
Recipients of the Croix de Guerre 1914–1918 (France)
Royal Yugoslav Army personnel of World War II
Burials at Belgrade New Cemetery